The Bronze of Ascoli was a bronze tablet discovered in Rome in 1908, which became notable for the study of the ancient Iberian language, because it contained the names of Iberian horsemen of the Turma Salluitana, who received Roman citizenship in 89 BCE after their participation in the siege of Asculum (modern Ascoli Piceno).

This inscription was a key document to understand the concept of bi-member names that Iberians used.

Content 
The part that includes the horsemen names goes as follows:

References

Archaeological discoveries in Italy
1908 archaeological discoveries